Ivide Thudangunnu is a 1984 Indian Malayalam-language crime thriller film directed by J. Sasikumar, written by S. L. Puram Sadanandan and produced by Mohan Sharma. It is a remake of the 1983 Kannada film Aasha, and stars Mohanlal, Sukumari, Rahman, Rohini, and Balan K. Nair. The film features music composed by Johnson. Ivide Thudangunnu was a major commercial success at the box office and a landmark film in Mohanlal's career.

Plot

Krishnakumar is an orphan and a policeman who lives with his younger sister Sheela. Sheela falls in love with her classmate Babu and Krishnakumar accepts him as his brother in law. But tragedy strikes the couple on their honeymoon when Babu is beaten into a coma and Sheela raped and killed. The police arrest four middle-age friends who follow them. But Krishnakumar discovers that his sister's murderers are actually Babu's three classmates who are freed thanks to M. S. Menon, one of the killer's father. Krishnakumar seeks revenge.

Cast

Mohanlal as Sub-inspector Krishnakumar 
Rahman as Babu 
Rohini as Sheela, Krishnakumar's sister
Rajyalakshmi as Indu 
Balan K. Nair as M. S. Menon 
Thikkurisi Sukumaran Nair as Adv. Balachandra Menon 
K. P. Ummer as Pappachan 
Meenakumari as Sarada 
Sankaradi as Kochannan
Achankunju as Panikker 
Bahadoor as Kurup 
Maniyanpilla Raju as Peter 
Santhosh as Rajan, M. S. Menon's son
C. I. Paul as Udumbu Narayanan, Smuggler
Janardanan as S. P.
Kuttyedathi Vilasini as Babu's mother
Kaduvakulam Antony as Krishnankutty
Kollam G. K. Pillai as P. C. Vasu Pilla

Soundtrack
The music was composed by Johnson and the lyrics were written by Poovachal Khader.

Release
The film was a major commercial success of that year in Mollywood box office. Ivide Thudangunnu was a landmark film in Mohanlal's career.

References

External links
 
 Watch in Prime Video

1984 films
1980s Malayalam-language films
1984 action films
1980s crime thriller films
Indian crime thriller films
Indian rape and revenge films
Films about rape in India
Malayalam remakes of Kannada films
Films scored by Johnson
Films directed by J. Sasikumar